"My Brother and I" is the second Christmas special of the British comedy series Dad's Army. It was originally transmitted on Friday 26 December 1975. The episode features Arthur Lowe in a dual role as his regular role of Captain Mainwaring and as Mainwaring's estranged brother Barry.

Synopsis
Just as Captain Mainwaring gives the go-ahead for a sherry party, his drunken brother Barry turns up to spoil the occasion.

Plot
As Mainwaring and the platoon return from an exhausting route march, he discovers Wilson reading Pike's Hotspur comic. There is a letter written in Pike's handwriting hidden amongst the pages. Mainwaring reads it and is instantly disgusted. He convenes an impromptu parade, where he confronts Pike about the letter, and asks Wilson to read it. It says that "the Home Guard will only spot any parachutists if they land in a public house", and that their section "made sure there were no parachutists in eleven pubs in two hours!"

Mainwaring makes the platoon promise that he will not hear any more stories about his men drinking on duty. He goes on to say that he has offered to be the host for a sherry party for local civic dignitaries and army officers. Jones' section (with the exception of Frazer, who is "meeting" a client in Eastbourne) volunteer themselves as stewards. When they leave, Mainwaring praises his men, declaring them "indispensable". Wilson asks if Mainwaring was harsh about the public house business, but Mainwaring does not think he was, and blames it on the way he was brought up, claiming every member of his family "knew when to stop".

Meanwhile, in a train carriage, a drunken figure with more than a passing resemblance to Mainwaring downs a hip flask of Scotch. The train stops at Eastbourne, and Frazer joins the man in the carriage, and quickly learns that the drunken man is Mainwaring's black sheep brother Barry, and that he is on his way to Walmington to collect a half-hunter watch that, he claims, Mainwaring stole from him after their father's death. Frazer is more than happy to tell Mainwaring that his brother is in town.

A few days later, Mainwaring tells Wilson that he is not ashamed of his brother, but he feels that Barry let his talents go to waste, while Mainwaring himself became a respected and trustworthy figure who can "look the world full in the face". Barry rings and Mainwaring declines the call, leaving it to Wilson. Mainwaring tells Wilson to tell Barry that he will meet him at the Red Lion Inn.

When he gets there, he confronts Barry about the watch. Barry claims that their father intended to give Barry the watch for looking after him. Mainwaring scoffs at his attempts to look after their father, and refuses to hand over the watch. Barry blackmails his brother by saying that he will show him up at the sherry party if he does not. Mainwaring reluctantly hands over the watch, getting Barry's solemn oath that he will be out of Walmington on the 9:30 train.

The party goes well until Barry unexpectedly arrives, wanting to apologise for his earlier behaviour, and gets into a lengthy chat with Chief Warden Hodges, the Vicar and the Verger. Pike drags him into the dressing room, giving him a whole bottle of sherry to placate him. Mainwaring arrives, and Hodges gleefully tells him that he had a chat with his brother. Mainwaring is shocked and asks Wilson, Frazer, Jones, Sponge and Pike to get him out as soon as possible.

They try shoving Barry through the window, but he is too fat, so they carry a comatose Barry out in an empty cupboard. Wilson admits to Mainwaring that he retrieved the watch for him, but Mainwaring's heart of gold allows him to give the watch back to Wilson, and he tells Wilson to give it back to Barry and wish him well.

Notes
There is only one scene where both the Mainwaring brothers appear on screen at the same time. This is set in the bedroom at the Red Lion hotel where Barry is staying. Barry spends most of the scene sitting or lying on his bed, whereas Captain Mainwaring stands close to the door. For some shots we see them both simultaneously, by the use of rear projection.

Cast
Arthur Lowe as Captain Mainwaring/Barry Mainwaring
John Le Mesurier as Sergeant Wilson
Clive Dunn as Lance Corporal Jones
John Laurie as Private Frazer
Arnold Ridley as Private Godfrey
Ian Lavender as Private Pike
Bill Pertwee as ARP Warden Hodges
Edward Sinclair as The Verger
Frank Williams as The Vicar
Penny Irving as Chambermaid
Arnold Diamond as Major-General Anstruther-Stevens
Colin Bean as Private Sponge
    

Dad's Army special episodes
Dad's Army (series 8) episodes
British Christmas television episodes
1975 British television episodes